Nicco most often refers to Nicco Maniatty (born 1977), an American singer.

Nicco may also refer to:

Nicco (surname), an Italian surname
A variant of the name Nicolas
Nicco park, an amusement park located in Salt Lake City, Kolkata, India

See also 
 Nico (disambiguation)